The Working Title was formed in 2001 and released their first E.P. Everyone Here Is Wrong in 2003. The EP was rated 5 out of 5 in Alternative Press Magazine, which also labeled The Working Title "A Band To Watch". The band's next LP, About Face, was released July 18, 2006. On October 6, 2005, The Working Title began "The Music Is Much Too Loud Tour" with Circa Survive, Mae, and Mutemath as an opening act. The band has also been on tour with bands such as mewithoutYou, Copeland, Vedera, As Tall as Lions, Counting Crows, Our Lady Peace and the Goo Goo Dolls.

They have had their music featured on MTV's Laguna Beach and in the film American Wedding.

In 2003 Damian Joseph, the band's guitarist and a founding member, parted ways with the group. He can be heard on the band's self-produced Sincerely album (2002) and half of Everyone Here is Wrong (2003). 

In late 2006 Chris Ginn, the band's bassist and a founding member, announced that he would be leaving the group to pursue a career in Structural Geology. He received a bachelor's degree in geology from College of Charleston in 2011 and is currently pursuing a Master's of Science in Structural Geology at The University of Georgia. The Working Title replaced him with Chris Gingrich.

May 9, 2009 saw the release of The Working Title's third album, Bone Island. Leading up to the creation of Bone Island, all of the members of the Working Title except for primary singer/songwriter Joel Hamilton left the band. In a review by AbsolutePunk, Bone Island was described as "a welcome, breath of fresh air".

Since the dissolution of the band, Hamilton has released an EP and an LP under his given name, an LP with Owen Beverly under the name Inlaws, an EP with Stephanie Underhill (who sings on Bone Island) under the name BABYLiPS, and most recently an LP under the name Mechanical River.

Members
 Joel Hamilton – vocals, guitar, piano

Former members
 Adam Pavao – guitar
 Chris Gingrich – bass
 Ross Taylor – drums
 Chris Ginn – bass
 Jason Maurer – bass
 Damian Joseph – guitar
 Matt Podesla – guitar
 Marcus Russell Price – bass
 Eric Sirianni – drums

Discography

Albums
 Sincerely  · 2002
 About-Face · 2006
 Bone Island · 2009

EPs
 Everyone Here Is Wrong · 2003
 Heart · 2008
 Bone Island Bonus EP · 2009

External links
 Facebook Profile
 MySpace Profile

Indie rock musical groups from South Carolina
Musical groups from South Carolina